The FIVB Volleyball Women's Nations League is an international volleyball competition contested by the senior women's national teams of the members of the  (FIVB), the sport's global governing body. The first tournament took place between May and July 2018, with the final taking place in Nanjing, China. United States won the inaugural edition, defeating Turkey in the final.

In July 2018, the FIVB announced that China would host the next three editions of the women's Volleyball Nations League Finals, from 2019–2021‌, but on March 13, 2020 the FIVB decided to postpone the Nations League until after the 2020 Summer Olympics due to the COVID-19 pandemic. Finally, the FIVB canceled the 2020 edition and confirmed Italy as the host of the final stage of the 2021 VNL.

The creation of the tournament was announced in October 2017 (alongside with the announcement of the Challenger Cup) as a joint project between the FIVB, the IMG and 21 national federations. The Nations League replaced the World Grand Prix, a former annual women's international event that ran between 1993 and 2017.

A corresponding tournament for men's national teams is the FIVB Volleyball Men's Nations League.

History

Adoption
In June 2017, Argentinian website Voley Plus reported that the FIVB would drastically change the format for both the 2018 World League and World Grand Prix. According to the reports, starting from 2018, the World League and the World Grand Prix would have only one Group (no more Groups 1, 2 and 3) of 16 national teams.

In October 2017, the FIVB announced, via a press release, the creation of the men's and women's Volleyball Nations League, confirming the tournaments as a replacement for the World League and World Grand Prix.

Marketing
The International Volleyball Federation has partnered with global brand strategy and design firm Landor Associates to create the Volleyball Nations League branding. Landor has also contributed with in-stadium and on-screen television graphics, staff uniforms, designs for the World Volleyball app, medals and the winning trophy.

Digital
Microsoft, the multinational technology company, has signed an agreement with the FIVB that the international federation vows will change the way the sport of volleyball is consumed while heightening the fan experience during match days as well as in the digital space. Under the tie-up, the ‘Microsoft Sports Digital Platform’ has been created to create new digital services and deliver personalised content on demand in order to boost the FIVB global audience and improve fan engagement.

Prize money
According to the FIVB, the prize money is equal for both the men's and women's VNL as per the FIVB's gender equality policy. At the preliminary round, the winning team is awarded US$9,000 for every win and the losing team is awarded US$4,000. The winner of the whole competition will receive US$1,000,000. The runner up will receive US$500,000, while the prize money given to third place is US$300,000. The players selected into Dream Team will receive US$10,000 each while the MVP will be given US$30,000.

Market performance
The FIVB announced that the 2019 Volleyball Nations League (both men's and women's) attracted a cumulative global audience of more than 1.5 billion. This number was an increase of 200 million from the 2018 VNL. In total. more than 600,000 tickets were sold in the 2019 VNL.

Format

Previous format
As in the former World Grand Prix, the competition will be divided in two phases, albeit with changes in the competition formula: a preliminary round (known as preliminary round), with a system of rotating host cities, and a final round played in a pre-selected host city.

The preliminary round is held over five weeks, versus three in the World Grand Prix. Each week, the participating teams are organized in pools, and each team plays one match against all other teams in its pool. All games in a pool take place over a weekend in the same city.

When all matches of the preliminary round have been played, the top five teams in the overall standings qualify for the final round, and the remaining ones leave the competition. The host nation automatically qualifies for the final round.

16 national teams will compete in the inaugural edition of the tournament; 12 core teams, which are always qualified, and 4 challenger teams, which can face relegation.

Preliminary round
The 16 teams compete in round-robin tournament, with every core team hosting a pool al least once. The teams are divided into 4 pools of 4 teams in each week and compete five weeks long, with a total of 120 matches. The top five teams after the round-robin tournament join the hosts in the final round. The relegation will consider the four challenger teams and the last ranked challenger team will be excluded from next edition. The winners of the Challenger Cup would qualify for next edition as a challenger team.

Final round
The six qualified teams play in 2 pools of 3 teams in a round-robin format. The top 2 teams of each pool qualify for the semifinals. The first ranked teams play against the second ranked teams in this round. The winners of the semifinals advance to compete for the Nations League title.

New format
The new format is applied to 2022 edition. The whole competition still be divided into two phases: The pool phase and the Finals.

Pool phase
The 16 teams will be divided into 2 groups of eight. Each team will play with 12 matches during the three weeks of the preliminary round. Two pools of eight teams will compete in four matches of six days of competition (Tuesday – Sunday). The new competition format allows for a one-week gap between events. The total number of matches in the pool phase will be 96.

The finals
The Finals will see the eight strongest teams moving directly to the knockout phase which will consist of eight matches in total: four quarterfinals, two semi-finals and the bronze and gold medal matches. The total number of matches in the final phase will be 8.

Challenger Cup

The FIVB Volleyball Challenger Cup will be a competition for national teams which will run in concurrence with the Volleyball Nations League. The Challenger Cup will consist of teams not participating in the current edition of the Volleyball Nations League and will feature one host team and five teams from the five continental confederations as follows:

The Continental Confederations, responsible for determining the teams that will qualify for the FIVB Challenger Cup, are free to organise their Continental Qualification Tournament or use an existing competition to define the qualified team(s).

The FIVB Challenger Cup is held before the FIVB Volleyball Nations League Finals (in 2018 and 2019 editions) but changed it in 2022 edition and the winners will qualify for the next year's VNL as a challenger team.

New VNL qualification system
The lowest ranked Challenger team of the current edition of the VNL will play the Volleyball Challenger Cup (VCC) held after the VNL. The winner of the current edition of the VCC shall be promoted and compete in the next edition of the VNL.

Hosts
List of hosts by number of final round championships hosted.

Appearance

Legend

Table current through the end of 2022 edition.

Results summary

Medals summary

MVP by edition

2018 – 
2019 – 
2021 – 
2022 –

Team performances by season

Legend
 – Champions
 – Runners-up
 – Third place
 – Fourth place
 – No movement for Challenger teams
 – Promoted to the next year of 0VNL
 – Relegated for Challenger teams

Table current through the start of the upcoming 2023 edition

See also

FIVB Volleyball Men's Nations League
FIVB Volleyball World Grand Prix
FIVB Volleyball Women's Challenger Cup
List of Indoor Volleyball World Medalists

Notes

References

External links
Fédération Internationale de Volleyball – official website
Volleyball Nations League – official website

 
Recurring sporting events established in 2018
International women's volleyball competitions
Annual sporting events